Syed Afzal Haider (born 1930- died 18 November 2022) was a Pakistani legal figure, who was Pakistan's caretaker Law, Justice, and Parliamentary Affairs minister. He was  also an author of several books.

Early life and education
Haider was born in Pakpattan, Punjab, Pakistan in 1930, the son of Syed Muhammad Shah, Advocate, in a so-called (Sayyid) family of the area, while his mother's family was from the Hakimkhana of Lahore.

He received his early education (1936-1947) from this town and afterwards, he did his Intermediate Higher Secondary study at FC College, then graduated with a Bachelor of Arts degree from Government College Lahore, and afterwards graduated as a lawyer from the Punjab University Law College. He has been practicing law since the 1950s. In addition, he has also been involved in various cultural and literary activities.

Career

Apart from his legal concerns, Syed Afzal Haider also participates in cultural and social activities. In 1987 he conducted the “Baba Farid International Conference", to commemorate the work of the famous South Asian Sufi saint, Fariduddin Ganjshakar.

With regard to the Law and Constitution he participated in many international conferences and delivered many lectures on Human Rights. From 1990-2003, he also remained Senior Member of the Council for Islamic Ideology in Pakistan.

He has authored several English and Urdu publications on Imam Khomeini, the Bhutto Trial, the Shariat Bill, Rehmatu-ul-Lil Alameen, F.I.R and many more. He is at present a faculty member of Qauid-Azam-Law College, Lahore.

Anand Karaj Act

Syed Afzal Haider was actively involved in the passage of the Sikh Marriage Ordinance of  2008 (also known as the 'Anand Karaj Act'). This ordinance marked Pakistan as being the first country in the world where Sikhs could get their marriages registered, based on their religion.

Judgments
On March 26, 2008 Syed Afzal Haider, who was law minister in the caretaker cabinet, took oath as judge of the Federal Shariat Court of Pakistan. In 2010, he gave an infamous verdict in Mian Abdur Razzaq Aamir v. Federal Government, holding sections of the Women's Protection Act of 2006 unconstitutional. The decision gave an expansive definition of the term "Hudood" in the Constitution, and asserted the Federal Shariat Court's "exclusive jurisdiction" over matters not just consisting of Hudood, but also "relating to" Hudood. This definition of Hudood includes Tazir as well. The advocates of the Women's Protection Act have argued that the judgment has dismantled the Act's legal reforms.

See also
 Federal Shariat Court of Pakistan
 Sikhism in Pakistan
 Shia Islam in Pakistan
 Riffat Hassan

References

External links
app.com.pk
qlc.edu.pk

Pakistani lawyers
Law Ministers of Pakistan
Living people
People from Pakpattan
Punjab University Law College alumni
1930 births